Adipurush is an upcoming Indian mythological film based on the Sanskrit epic Ramayana. The film is written and directed by Om Raut and produced by T-Series and Retrophiles. Shot simultaneously in Hindi and Telugu languages, the film stars Prabhas, Kriti Sanon, and Saif Ali Khan in his Telugu debut, along with Sunny Singh and Vatsal Sheth in pivotal roles.

Adipurush was announced in August 2020, through an official motion poster. Principal photography commenced in February 2021 and ended in November 2021 taking place primarily in Mumbai, followed by post-production works. The film's music is composed by Ajay–Atul.

The film is scheduled for a theatrical release on 16 June 2023.

Premise 
7,000 years ago, Ayodhya's king Rama travels to the island of Lanka with the help of Hanuman's army with an aim to rescue his wife Sita, who has been abducted by Ravana, the demon king of Lanka.

Cast
 Prabhas as Raghava
 Kriti Sanon as Janaki
 Saif Ali Khan as Lankesh
 Sunny Singh as Lakshmana
 Devdatta Nage as Hanuman
 Vatsal Sheth as indrajit
 Sonal Chauhan
 Trupti Toradmal

Production

Development

Adipurush, an adaptation of the Hindu epic Ramayana, was announced on 18 August 2020, via a promotional poster. Prabhas portrays Lord Rama under the direction of Om Raut who earlier helmed the period action film Tanhaji (2020). Om Raut was fascinated by the 1992 Japanese film Ramayana: The Legend of Prince Rama and was motivated to adapt the epic Ramayana into a film using modern technology. Raut wrote the script amidst COVID-19 lockdown in India. Prabhas immediately liked the project and the production company T-Series Films was on-board for the project.

It is shot simultaneously in Hindi and Telugu languages, and is filmed in 3D.

Casting

In September 2020, the makers revealed that Prabhas is enacting Lord Rama's portrayal whose character name was later revealed as Raghava. Saif Ali Khan who already worked as an antagonist in Raut's Tanhaji has been signed for the role of Ravana with the name Lankesh. After rumours of Anushka Shetty, Anushka Sharma, Kiara Advani, and Keerthy Suresh being approached for the role of Sita, it was reported in November 2020 that Kriti Sanon has been cast to essay the role; her inclusion into the film was confirmed by makers four months later in March 2021. Sunny Singh who joined the sets in February 2021 is playing Lord Rama's younger brother Lakshmana.

Filming

Motion capture shoot for Adipurush begun on 19 January 2021. Muhurat shot and formal launch was done on 2 February 2021 in Mumbai, India. Principal photography of the movie began that day, as informed by the makers. A massive fire accident took place at the filming location in Mumbai on the same day. Duplicate sets were erected same wise due to the fire breakout. In October 2021, Khan and Sanon wrapped up shoot.  On 10 November 2021, the filming was completed.

Marketing 
The film's teaser was released on 2 October 2022 on the occasion of Gandhi Jayanti. The teaser received heavy criticism for the poor quality of the VFX and CGI.

Release
Adipurush was scheduled to theatrically release on 16 June 2023 in Hindi and Telugu, along with dubbed versions in Tamil, Kannada, Malayalam. It was previously scheduled to release on 11 August 2022, but was later postponed due to the release of Laal Singh Chaddha. The film was postponed again to avoid a clash with Veera Simha Reddy and Waltair Veerayya and also for reworking the visual effects, due to the severe backlash after the release of the teaser trailer. It is now scheduled to release on 16 June 2023 worldwide.

Notes

References

External links 

 
 

Upcoming Indian films
Upcoming Telugu-language films
Upcoming Hindi-language films
2023 drama films
Indian 3D films
Indian multilingual films
Indian mythology in popular culture
Hindu mythological films
Indian epic films
Films scored by M. M. Keeravani
Films shot in Mumbai
Upcoming films
Films based on the Ramayana
Films directed by Om Raut